Cory House may refer to:

Cory House (College Park, Maryland)
Miller-Cory House, Westfield, New Jersey, listed on the National Register of Historic Places (NRHP)
Ambrose Cory House, Fostoria, Ohio, NRHP-listed in Seneca County